The 1925–26 Montreal Maroons season saw the team win their first Stanley Cup in only their second season.

Regular season
Rookie Nels Stewart led the league in goals, with 34, and points, 42, to win the Art Ross Trophy as the league's leading scorer. His accomplishments also won him the Hart Trophy as the league's most valuable player.

Final standings

Record vs. opponents

Playoffs
The Maroons took on the first-year team Pittsburgh Pirates in a two-game, total-goals series. The Maroons won the first game 3–1 and tied the second to win the series six goals to four.

In the second round, the Maroons took on the first-place Ottawa Senators. At home in the first game, the Maroons tied the Senators 1–1. Former Senator Punch Broadbent scored at 8 minutes of the second period to put the Maroons ahead. The lead lasted until King Clancy tied the game with ten seconds left. In the second game, held at Ottawa, the Maroons took the series with a 1–0 shutout victory to win the NHL championship. Babe Siebert on an individual rush, scored off his own rebound at the six-minute mark of the second period. Cy Denneny appeared to tie the score a minute later, but the play was off-side. The Maroons held off the attack of the Senators the rest of the way in front of a record attendance of 10,525.

After the final game in Ottawa, an anonymous supporter gave a $1,000 cheque to team president James Strachan "to be divided up among the boys for their fighting victory."

Stanley Cup Final

Nels Stewart was "Old Poison" to the Victoria Cougars, as he scored 6 goals in the 4 games and goaltender Clint Benedict shut out the westerners three times. All games were played at the Forum in Montreal.

Victoria Cougars vs. Montreal Maroons

Montreal Maroons win best-of-five series 3 games to 1 for the Stanley Cup

Schedule and results

Playoffs
Pittsburgh Pirates vs. Montreal Maroons

Montreal wins total goals series 6 goals to 4

Montreal Maroons vs. Ottawa Senators

Montreal wins total goals series 2 goals to 1

Player stats

Scoring leaders
Note: GP = Games played; G = Goals; A = Assists; Pts = Points

Goaltenders
GP = Games played, GA = Goals against, SO = Shutouts, GAA = Goals against average

Awards and records
 Nels Stewart – Art Ross Trophy, Hart Trophy
 O'Brien Cup – for 1925–26 NHL champion.
 Prince of Wales Trophy – for 1925–26 NHL playoff champion.

Transactions

See also
 1925–26 NHL season

References

Montreal Maroons seasons
Montreal
Montreal
Stanley Cup championship seasons